Events in the year 1943 in Norway.

Incumbents
Government in Exile (in London)
 Monarch – Haakon VII
 Prime Minister – Johan Nygaardsvold (Labour Party)
German Military Governor
 Reichskommissar in Norway – Josef Terboven
German Puppet Government in Oslo
 Minister-President – Vidkun Quisling (National Unification)

Events
 5 February – The Norwegian submarine HNoMS Uredd is destroyed by a German minefield. The 39 men aboard as well as six Special Operations Executive (SOE) agents are killed in the sinking. The wreck of the submarine was only discovered in 1985.
 24 February – 158 Norwegian Jews are deported from Norway to German extermination camps.
 28 February – Operation Gunnerside: Six Norwegian SOE agents led by Joachim Rønneberg successfully attack the heavy water plant at Vemork.
 24 July – An allied air raid completely destroys the aluminium and magnesium plants in Herøya being built by Norsk Hydro in cooperation with Luftwaffe-operated Nordische Aluminium Aktiengesellschaft (Nordag). 55 construction workers are killed.
 28 July – MTB 345, a motor torpedo boat operated by the exiled Royal Norwegian Navy, is captured by the Germans off Western Norway. The seven-man Norwegian-British crew was executed in Bergen two days later based on Adolf Hitler's Commando Order
 21 September – Operation Source: British midget submarines attack the German battleship Tirpitz, at anchor in the Kåfjord, crippling her for six months.
 30 September – the sinking of the Hurtigruten passenger ship Sanct Svithun by Allied aircraft leads to heavy protests from the Norwegian resistance movement.
 16 November – 160 American bombers strike a hydro-electric power facility and heavy water factory in Vemork, Norway.
 26 December  – the German battleship Scharnhorst is sunk off of Norway's North Cape after a battle against major Royal Navy forces.

Gallery

Popular culture

Music

Film

Literature

Notable births

January 
 
 
 
 

4 January – Kristin Brudevoll, literary scholar and organizational leader.
9 January – Odd Magnus Faltinsen, mathematician and professor of marine technology.
11 January 
Jon Bakken, politician
Roald Jensen, footballer (died 1987).
16 January – Tore Schweder, statistician.
19 January – Gro Hillestad Thune, jurist and politician
20 January 
Torkjell Berulfsen, television personality
Einar Førde, politician and Minister (died 2004).
25 January – Tore Planke, engineer, inventor and businessperson.
26 January – Erik Must, stock broker and investor.
27 January 
Steinar Gil, philologist and diplomat
Eva Heir, politician.
28 January – Håkon Steinar Giil, politician
31 January – Ragnhild Nilstun, novelist, children's writer and literary critic.

February 
 
 

4 February 
Tom Amundsen, sport rower and physician (died 2017).
Hallvard Bakke, politician and Minister.
5 February – Jostein Berntsen, politician
6 February 
Asbjørn Kjønstad, professor of law
Unn Thorvaldsen, javelin thrower.
9 February – Terje Pedersen, javelin thrower
13 February – Håkon Aasnes, comics artist and writer.
18 February – Torstein Hagen, engineer and businessman.
20 February – Babill Stray-Pedersen, physician (died 2019).
22 February – Astrid Bjellebø Bayegan, theologian.
25 February – Liv Jagge-Christiansen, tennis player and alpine skier.

March 
 
 

3 March 
Jan Ragnar Hagland, philologist.
Trond Mohn, businessperson and philanthropist
5 March – Inger Stolt-Nielsen, schoolteacher and politician.
9 March – Sven Trygve Falck, engineer, businessperson and politician (died 2019).
11 March – Rolf Groven, painter.
12 March – Magnhild Holmberg, politician (died 2013).
13 March – Einar Lunde, journalist and news anchor.
14 March 
Bjørn Odmar Andersen, footballer (died 2008)
Ole Daniel Enersen, climber, photographer, journalist, writer and medical historian
16 March – William Nygaard, publisher
17 March – Karl Helland, racing cyclist.
20 March 
Gerd Kjellaug Berge, hotelier and organisational leader.
Jon Christensen, jazz percussionist (died 2020).
Unne Terjesen, model
27 March – Arne Vinje, chess player (died 2011).
29 March – Rigmor Aarø Spiten, politician.

April 
 

2 April – Gunnar Stavseth, journalist and politician
3 April – Trond Mohn, businessman and philanthropist.
6 April – Johs Harviken, cross country skier and Olympic silver medallist
8 April – Gunnar Breivik, sociologist
14 April – Britt Hildeng, politician (died 2022).
17 April 
Erik Magnus Boe, legal scholar.
Peter Lorange, economist.
18 April – Carl Graff-Wang, handball player
18 April – Svein Hansen, ice hockey player (died 2012).
20 April – Per Søderstrøm, handball player
23 April  
Jan Hårstad, actor.
Nils Sletta, actor (died 2020).
Knut Storbukås, singer and songwriter.
28 April 
Karl Johan Johannessen, footballer.
Jan Levor Njargel, politician (died 2020).

May 
 

2 May – Arne Paus, visual artist and painter
3 May – Jan Terje Faarlund, linguist.
4 May – Reidar Åsgård, politician
8 May – Hans Raastad, economist, and former leader of the Workers' Youth League.
14 May – Johan Ludvik Løvald, diplomat
28 May – Arve Haugen, cyclist.
29 May – Nina Karin Monsen, moral philosopher and author
31 May – Aud Hvammen, alpine skier.

June 
 

1 June – Egil Hestnes, politician
7 June – Jakob Margido Esp, actor.
12 June – Thor Furulund, painter (died 2016).
22 June – Synnøve Tronsvang, politician
23 June – Wenche Blomberg, author.
27 June – Kjersti Døvigen, actress (died 2021).
29 June 
Jan Knutzen, documentary filmmaker.
Fred Robsahm, film actor (died 2015).

July 
 

2 July 
Olav Hytta, businessperson.
Svein Bredo Østlien, footballer.
3 July – Svein Sundsbø, businessperson and politician
4 July – Mary Synnøve Kvidal, politician and Minister.
6 July 
Jan Fridthjof Bernt, jurist.
Trond Nordby, historian and political scientist
10 July – Helge Kringstad, banker, civil servant and politician.
15 July – Frithjof Prydz, ski jumper and tennis player (died 1992).
17 July – Ola Solum, film director (died 1996).
19 July 
Arvid Gjengedal, academic and politician
Otto Homlung, stage producer and theatre director.
22 July – Nils Utsi, actor (died 2019).
24 July 
Ola Bauer, novelist and playwright (died 1999).
Hennild Wollstadmo, politician
27 July – Einar Lutro, politician
30 July – Magne Myrmo, cross country skier, Olympic silver medallist and World Champion.

August 
 
 

4 August – Bjørn Wirkola, ski jumper and World Champion, soccer player
6 August – Ivar Ueland, politician (died 2020).
7 August – Kleiv Fiskvik, trade unionist and politician.
13 August 
Inge Grødum, illustrator.
Dagfinn Hjertenes, politician (died 2006)
16 August – Arnulf Bæk, handball player
17 August – Kjersti Scheen, illustrator and writer.
18 August – John H. Larsen Jr., sports shooter.
20 August – Peter Nicolay Ræder, diplomat.
21 August – Herman Friele, businessman and politician.
25 August – Ståle Eskeland, jurist (died 2015).
27 August – Helge Rykkja, author, poet, teacher and politician (died 2020).
28 August – Anne-Lise Berntsen, soprano (died 2012).
29 August – Lars Sigmundstad, politician

September 
 
 
 

1 September 
Kirsti Kolle Grøndahl, politician.
Helge Rønning, literary scholar.
3 September 
Jan S. Levy, civil servant and politician.
Jorunn Ringstad, politician
10 September – Tor Edvin Dahl, novelist, crime fiction writer, playwright, children's writer, non-fiction writer, translator, literary critic and journalist.
13 September – Anna Elisabeth Ljunggren, physiotherapist, (died 2010).
16 September – Einar Niemi, historian.
20 September – Arne Halaas, professor in computer technology and telematics.
30 September – Thore Langfeldt, psychologist and sexologist

October 
 

3 October – Arne Bjørlykke, geologist
6 October – Bjøro Håland, country singer
6 October – Trygve Hegnar, investor, publisher and editor.
6 October – Sverre Mauritzen, diplomat and politician.
12 October – Odd Einar Dørum, politician and Minister.
15 October – Bjarne Hodne, folklorist.
16 October – Terje Moe, painter (died 2004).
19 October – Amund Venger, politician (died 2013).
25 October – Wenche Krossøy, children's writer (died 2010).
26 October 
Ståle Dyrvik, historian
Svein Mønnesland, linguist.
27 October – Torstein Hansen, handball player (died 2018).
31 October – Thorleif Enger, businessperson.

November 
 
 

5 November – Kjell Magne Yri, priest, linguist and translator
7 November – Dikke Eger-Bergman, alpine skier.
12 November 
Julie Ege, actress and model (died 2008)
Thorgeir Stubø, jazz guitarist and composer (died 1986)
22 November – Torill Thorstad Hauger, novelist, children's writer and non-fiction writer (died 2014).
25 November – Kjeld Rimberg, engineer and business executive.
28 November – Hans Svelland, politician.

December 
 

1 December – Finn E. Kydland, economist
3 December – Bjørn Boysen, organist and educator (died 2018).
3 December – Ingmar Ljones, politician
4 December – Knut Haavik, journalist and magazine editor (died 2019).
5 December 
Kåre Østensen, ice hockey player.
Eva Joly, magistrate in France
6 December – Mette Ravn, diplomat
7 December – Per Fugelli, professor of medicine.
12 December – Tore Bjørnsen, weightlifter.
14 December – Kari Oftedal Lima, politician
15 December – Håvard Holm, civil servant (died 2017).
17 December – Thorbjørn Lie, businessperson and politician (died 2006)
20 December – Svein Longva, economist and civil servant (died 2009)
29 December – Arne Øren, politician
29 December – Helge Pharo, historian

Full date unknown
Gisle Handeland, politician
Eldbjørg Løwer, politician
Tom Martinsen, photographer (died 2007).
Ola H. Metliaas, civil servant and politician (died 2005).

Notable deaths

January
9 January – Anathon Aall, academic (born 1867)
18 January – Urban Jacob Rasmus Børresen, rear admiral (born 1857)

February
10 February – Sverre Granlund, commando (born 1918)
28 February – Leonhard Hess Stejneger, zoologist (born 1851)

March
1 March – Odd Starheim, resistance fighter and SOE agent (born 1916)
12 March – Gustav Vigeland, sculptor (born 1869)
13 March – Hanna Resvoll-Holmsen, botanist (born 1873)

May
1 May  – Johan Oscar Smith, Christian leader, founder of the Brunstad Christian Church (born 1871)
2 May – Nils Gregoriussen Skilbred, politician (born 1860)
19 May – Peder Morset, teacher and resistance member (born 1887).

July
14 July – Carl Johan Ege (1852–1943), Norwegian banker

September
1 September – Karl Aas, gymnast and Olympic silver medallist (born 1899)
30 September – Johan Ludwig Mowinckel, politician and three-times Prime Minister of Norway (born 1870)

October
17 October – Arthur Olsen II, boxer (born 1907)

November
25 November – Einar Høigård, educator (born 1907).
26 November – Anders Hovden, hymnwriter, priest, author and popular speaker (born 1860)

December
2 December – Nordahl Grieg, poet, novelist, dramatist, and journalist (born 1902)
7 December – Per Imerslund, politician, soldier and writer (born 1912)
9 December – Harald Halvorsen, politician (born 1877).
10 December – Olaf Sletten, shooter and Olympic silver medallist (born 1886)
16 December – Frederik Macody Lund, historian (born 1863)

Full date unknown
Axel Aubert, businessperson (born 1873)
Ole Ludvig Bærøe, politician (born 1877)
Ingolf Elster Christensen, politician (born 1872)
Jens Holmboe, botanist (born 1880)
Herman Jeremiassen, ship-owner and politician (born 1851)
Karsten Konow, sailor and Olympic silver medallist (born 1918)
Olav Scheflo, politician and journalist (born 1883)
Arvid Storsveen, intelligence officer (born 1915)

See also

References

External links